Nevzat Soguk is a professor of political science at the University of Hawaii at Manoa, specializing in the areas of globalization, migration and critical international relations theory.

References

University of Hawaiʻi faculty
Living people
Place of birth missing (living people)
Year of birth missing (living people)
Ohio University alumni
Gazi University alumni
Arizona State University alumni